The rufous-throated antbird (Gymnopithys rufigula) is a species of bird in the family Thamnophilidae. It is found in Brazil, French Guiana, Guyana, Suriname, and Venezuela. Its natural habitat is subtropical or tropical moist lowland forests.

Taxonomy
The rufous-throated antbird was described by the French polymath Georges-Louis Leclerc, Comte de Buffon in 1775 in his Histoire Naturelle des Oiseaux from a specimen collected in Cayenne, French Guiana. The bird was also illustrated in a hand-coloured plate engraved by François-Nicolas Martinet in the Planches Enluminées D'Histoire Naturelle which was produced under the supervision of Edme-Louis Daubenton to accompany Buffon's text. Neither the plate caption nor Buffon's description included a scientific name but in 1783 the Dutch naturalist Pieter Boddaert coined the binomial name Turdus rufigula in his catalogue of the Planches Enluminées.  The rufous-throated antbird is now placed in the genus Gymnopithys was introduced by the French ornithologist Charles Lucien Bonaparte in 1857 with the rufous-throated antbird as the type species. The name Gymnopithys combines the Ancient Greek gumnos meaning "bare" or "naked" with the name of the antbird genus Pithys that was erected by the French ornithologist Louis Jean Pierre Vieillot in 1818. The specific epithet rufigula combines the Latin words rufus "red" and gula "throat".

Three subspecies are recognised:
 Gymnopithys rufigula pallidus (Cherrie, 1909) – south Venezuela
 Gymnopithys rufigula pallidigula Phelps & Phelps Jr, 1947 – tepuis of extreme southwest Venezuela
 Gymnopithys rufigula rufigula (Boddaert, 1783) – east Venezuela, the Guianas and northeast Brazil

References

Further reading

rufous-throated antbird
Birds of the Guianas
rufous-throated antbird
Taxonomy articles created by Polbot